HNLMS Friesland is a  operated by the Royal Netherlands Navy. The ship entered service on 22 January 2013 and is named after the Dutch province of Friesland.

History
The vessel was built in the Romanian shipyards, in Galati, by the Dutch firm Damen Group. The keel laying took place on 26 November 2009 and the launching on 4 November 2010. The ship was put into service on 22 January 2013.

On 26 April 2012, Friesland assisted in the rescue of a sail training vessel off Iona while participating in an international exercise.

In November 2015 Friesland, and elements of the United States Coast Guard, cooperated in the seizure of $17 million of cocaine. The operation was part of Operation Caribbean Venture, under the overall command of the Royal Netherlands Navy.

On 20 September 2018 Friesland intercepted a go-fast with its NH-90. The cargohold of the go-fast contained 900 kg of cocaine. The passengers of the boat were delivered to the United States Coast Guard.

See also
 HNLMS Holland (P840)
 HNLMS Zeeland (P841)
 HNLMS Groningen (P843)

References

Holland-class offshore patrol vessels
2010 ships
Ships built in Romania
Patrol vessels of the Royal Netherlands Navy